Oyalı can refer to:

 Oyalı (sheep)
 Oyalı, Besni
 Oyalı, Eğil